Hendrik Groot (22 April 1938 – 11 May 2022) was a Dutch footballer who played as a forward and attacking midfielder. Groot made his professional debut on 23 August 1959 in a 3–0 win of Ajax against NAC Breda. He also played for Feyenoord. He was born in Zaandijk. He was related to player Kick Groot.

Honours
Ajax
 Eredivisie: 1959–60, 1965–66, 1966–67, 1967–68
 KNVB Cup: 1960–61, 1966–67
 International Football Cup: 1961–62

Feyenoord
 Eredivisie: 1964–65
 KNVB Cup: 1964–65

Individual
 Eredivisie top scorer: 1959–60 – 38 goals in 33 matches, 1960–61 – 41 goals in 32 matches
There are mildly differing numbers out there with regards to the number of matches and goals.

References

External links
 Henk Groot, AFC Ajax (per 12 March 2020)
 
 John Beuker: Netherlands - Eredivisie Top Scorers, Rec.Sport.Soccer Statistics Foundation, 2019-06-20
 Karel Stokkermans" Henk Groot - Goals in International Matches'',  Rec.Sport.Soccer Statistics Foundation, 20101-09-24

1938 births
2022 deaths
Footballers from Zaanstad
Dutch footballers
Association football forwards
Netherlands international footballers
Eredivisie players
AFC Ajax players
Feyenoord players